Gazólaz is a village and council belonging to the municipality of Cendea de Cizur located in the province and autonomous community of Navarre (Navarra/Nafarroa), northern Spain. As of January 2009 INE census figures, Gazólaz has a population of 145 inhabitants.

Gallery

Localities of Spain
Populated places in Navarre